William Cyril Desmond Pacey,  (May 1, 1917 – July 4, 1975), was a pioneer of Canadian literary criticism. He was also a notable author of verse and short fiction and a long-time university administrator. He was awarded the Lorne Pierce Medal by the Royal Society of Canada in 1972.

As chair of the University of New Brunswick English Department in the 1940s, Pacey worked closely with Roy Daniels of the University of British Columbia to initiate English PhD programs at both universities, effectively breaking the academic stranglehold the University of Toronto held on higher education in Canadian universities.

Biography

Early life, education, and career
Pacey was born in 1917 in Dunedin, New Zealand to parents William and Mary. After his father was killed during the First World War, Pacey and his mother moved to England; in 1931, Mary married a Canadian farmer, and the family emigrated to Ontario, Canada.

As an undergraduate, Pacey attended the University of Toronto, where he earned a degree in English and Philosophy. Upon graduation, he enrolled at Cambridge, where he was awarded his doctorate in 1941.

Pacey began his academic career in 1940 when he accepted a post at Brandon University in Manitoba. In 1944, he accepted a position of chair of the Department of English at the University of New Brunswick, where he worked in various professorial and administrative capacities – as dean of graduate studies, as academic vice president, and as acting president – until his death in 1975.

Pacey published important work on Frederick Philip Grove, Sir Charles G.D. Roberts, and Ethel Wilson, among others. He worked as a contributing editor for Carl Klinck's landmark Literary History of Canada.

Legacy and honors
Pacey was awarded honorary degrees from the University of New Brunswick and from Mount Allison University in 1973. UNB launched its annual W.C. Desmond Pacey Memorial Lecture in 1980/81, at which time the first lecture was given by Northrop Frye. Most recently, in 2011/12, the lecture was given by Tony Penikett, two-term Premier of the Yukon.

According to Philip Kokotalio, Pacey is often "regarded as a champion of social and environmental realism in Canada." The critic Frank Davey has argued that Pacey "demanded that the Canadian writer demonstrate his freedom from colonial mimicry by attending to Canadian experience."

Selected works

Academic
 Frederick Philip Grove. Toronto: Ryerson, 1945
 Creative Writing in Canada: A Short History of English-Canadian Literature. Toronto: Ryerson, 1945
 Ten Canadian Poets: A Group of Biographical and Critical Essays. Toronto: Ryerson, 1958
 Ethel Wilson. New York: Twayne, 1968
 Essays in Canadian Criticism, 1938–1968. Toronto: Ryerson, 1969

Creative
 Hippity Hobo and the Bee and Other Verses for Children. Fredericton: Brunswick, 1952
 The Picnic, and Other Stories. Toronto: Ryerson, 1958

References

External links
 "The Lives of a Poet: the Correspondence of Earle Birney and Desmond Pacey, 1957–58." Canadian Poetry volume 56. Tracy Ware.
 The Pacey papers. A detailed source of information regarding Desmond Pacey's life and works. Archives and Special Collections Department, Harriet Irving Library, UNB.

1917 births
1975 deaths
Canadian literary critics
Fellows of the Royal Society of Canada
Literary critics of English
University of Toronto alumni
Academic staff of the University of New Brunswick